Tellef Inge Mørland  (born 21 April 1980) is a Norwegian politician. 
He was elected representative to the Storting for the period 2017–2021 for the Labour Party, representing the constituency of Aust-Agder.

Controversy
In September 2021 the newspaper Aftenposten reported that Mørland's benefit of free housing during his term at the Storting possibly was in violation of the conditions for such benefits.

References

1980 births
Living people
People from Åmli
University of Agder alumni
Labour Party (Norway) politicians
Members of the Storting
Aust-Agder politicians
Chairmen of County Councils of Norway
21st-century Norwegian politicians